Cherry Crush is a British novel written by Scottish author Cathy Cassidy. It is the first book for the Chocolate Box Girls series. The book revolves around the suddenly upturned life of Cherry Costello, who just moved to Somerset with her father, to live with her father's girlfriend, Charlotte Tanberry. When she arrives there, she realizes she has four new sisters. The plot of the book deals with her attraction to her new stepsister's boyfriend, Shay. She also has to control her desire to fit in.

Conception
The storyline features familiar themes to fans of Cassidy's work, such as family struggles, acceptance of newcomers, unrequited love, and the growth and changes during adolescence.

Cassidy wanted to write a book about chocolate, choosing to write about five different individuals and their love of chocolate. Excluding Cassidy's series for younger readers, Daizy Starr, and two loosely linked books, Dizzy and Lucky Star, The Chocolate Box Girls is her first series of books.

Synopsis
The book starts when Cherry and her father Paddy are about to move to Somerset, to live with his girlfriend Charlotte and her four daughters; Skye, Summer, Coco, and Honey. Charlotte and Paddy also want to start their dream business: making chocolate. In Tanglewood, Charlotte's home, Cherry meets Shay Fletcher and begins to develop a crush on him. However, Shay already has a girlfriend: Charlotte's spiteful eldest daughter, Honey. Cherry knows her friendship with Shay is dangerous, and she tries to impress and make her stepsisters like her by telling lies about the luxurious life she used to lead back in Glasgow. But soon she learns that the girls have already sensed that they are just lying. and also, that they liked her better when she was the real Cherry instead of Cherry the liar. Honey and Cherry have many fights, mainly because she suspects that Cherry and Shay are becoming too close to each other. The girls and Charlotte also assist Paddy in starting a chocolate business by organizing a successful chocolate festival, and Paddy's chocolates are in high demand. The story concludes with Shay and Cherry traveling by canoe after Cherry is slapped by Honey and her lies as the canoe breaks down. They end up spending the night together in a cave and are found in the morning. Shay's dad finally realizes his son's value and decides not to be hard on him. After that, Shay and Cherry end up becoming a couple.

Sequels
Five books have been published for The Chocolate Box Girls game

Cherry Crush'''s immediate sequel, Marshmallow Skye, has already been published, and the third book in the series, Summer's Dream was released on 7 June 2012.

The last three books are Coco Caramel and Sweet Honey and Fortune Cookie. Coco Caramel was released in June 2013, Sweet Honey was released in 2014 and Fortune Cookie'' was released in June 2015. The latter is the last book in the series.

References

2010 British novels
British young adult novels
English-language novels
Puffin Books books